Belén García Espinar (born 26 July 1999 in L'Ametlla del Vallès) is a Spanish female racing driver and pole vaulter. She is a Spanish F4 race winner, and came fifth in the W Series in 2022. She currently competes in the Asian Le Mans Series for Graff.

She is not related to Marta García.

Biography
Belén García was born and raised in L'Ametlla del Vallès, a small village near the city of Barcelona. Her parents José Luis and Pilar run motorsport timing company Al Kamel Systems, her father also being a professional rally driver.

In conjunction with her racing, García is also a competitively-registered pole vaulter with Club Atlètic Granollers.

Career

Karting
García began karting in 2015 in the Spanish Karting Championship, where she finished 10th in 2018 in the Senior-KZ2 class.

Lower formulae
She made her professional single-seater debut a year later, competing in the 2019 F4 Spanish Championship for Global Racing Service. She became the first woman to win a Formula 4 race in Europe at just her second attempt at the Circuito de Navarra, but only managed a best result of seventh after that. She eventually finished the season 15th overall on equal points with Nerea Martí, thus beating her to the female trophy on countback. She also received a call-up to race for Team Spain at the 2019 FIA Motorsport Games, as their representative in the Formula 4 Cup, where she finished 6th, from 12th on the grid.

W Series
The Catalan driver qualified for the W Series, a Formula 3 championship for women, in 2020. She was set to twin this with participation in selected rounds of another Formula 3 championship, the Formula Renault Eurocup. However, following the cancellation of the 2020 W Series and the withdrawal of Global Racing Service from the 2020 Formula Renault Eurocup due to the COVID-19 pandemic, she was left without a drive for the season. She then opted for a temporary return to karting, finishing 7th overall in the KZ category of the Spanish Karting Championship, ahead of former Formula 1 driver Roberto Merhi. García also raced in the final round of the Spanish Endurance Championship at Ciudad del Motor de Aragón, driving for NM Racing Team along with her father, in a Ginetta G55 GT4. They finished 6th in race 1 and 10th in race 2 overall but were ineligible for championship points.

In 2021, García made her debut in the W Series, while also racing part-time in the Formula Regional European Championship with G4 Racing as preparation. She starred in the W Series season-opening round at the Red Bull Ring, where she qualified 3rd, dropped to 9th after running wide at turn 6, and then climbed back up to finish the race 4th. However, she was unable to replicate such performance in the remainder of the year, eventually finishing 10th in the standings with 28 points.

García continued racing in the W Series for 2022. Paired with fellow Spanish driver Nerea Martí at the Quantfury team, García proved a much more consistent force, as she scored points in six of the seven rounds that took place before the season was called off in October due to financial issues. She secured her first series podium at Le Castellet in July with 2nd place, and finished the season fifth in the standings, ahead of Martí.

Endurance racing
After the cancellation of the remaining 2022 W Series rounds, García switched to endurance racing. She made her LMP3 debut at the Le Mans Cup season finale at Portimão in October, racing for CD Sport alongside Chinese gentleman driver Huilin Han. A lengthy red flag period meant she effectively had little more than 20 minutes of driving in the race, where they finished 17th, but she later described the experience as "a lot of fun" and said she was "looking forward to driving a car like that again". She had her second LMP3 experience four weeks later, racing for Graff in the Ultimate Cup Series season-ending four-hour race at Paul Ricard. García proved to be quick from the start, as she led the first practice session by more than a second over newly-crowned champion Lucca Allen. Issues in qualifying meant she —along with bronze-rated teammates Eric Trouillet and Sébastien Page— had to start from tenth place, but by the end of the first hour they were already in the lead, and the trio ended up taking the win with a healthy 76-second margin. García set the second fastest lap of the race, a mere tenth of a second slower than LMP3 veteran Matt Bell.

García remained with Trouillet and Page for her first full-time campaign in endurance racing, as she is set to tackle the 2023 Asian Le Mans Series in one of Graff's Ligier JS P320 LMP3 cars.

Karting record

Karting career summary

Racing record

Racing career summary

† As García was a guest driver, she was ineligible to score points.

Complete F4 Spanish Championship results 
(key) (Races in bold indicate pole position) (Races in italics indicate fastest lap)

Complete FIA Motorsport Games results

Complete Formula Regional European Championship results 
(key) (Races in bold indicate pole position) (Races in italics indicate fastest lap)

Complete W Series results 
(key) (Races in bold indicate pole position) (Races in italics indicate fastest lap)

† Driver did not finish the race, but was classified as they completed more than 90% of the race distance.

Complete Asian Le Mans Series results 
(key) (Races in bold indicate pole position) (Races in italics indicate fastest lap)

References

External links
 

Spanish racing drivers
Spanish female racing drivers
1999 births
Living people
Spanish F4 Championship drivers
W Series drivers
Spanish female pole vaulters
People from Vallès Oriental
Sportspeople from the Province of Barcelona
Formula Regional European Championship drivers
FIA Motorsport Games drivers
Karting World Championship drivers
Graff Racing drivers
Asian Le Mans Series drivers
Le Mans Cup drivers